Adriana Serra Zanetti and Emily Stellato were the defending champions, but lost in the first round to eventual champions Anabel Medina Garrigues and Arantxa Sánchez Vicario.

Seeds

  Maret Ani /  Emmanuelle Gagliardi (quarterfinals)
  Rita Grande /  Flavia Pennetta (semifinals)
  Ľubomíra Kurhajcová /  Henrieta Nagyová (finals)
  Mervana Jugić-Salkić /  Angelika Rösch (first round)

Results

Draw

References

Internazionali Femminili di Palermo - Singles
2004 Singles
Sport in Palermo
Tennis in Italy